The 1940–41 Wisconsin Badgers men's basketball team represented the University of Wisconsin. The head coach was Bud Foster, coaching his seventh season with the Badgers and were members of the Big Ten Conference. Wisconsin  won their  only NCAA title, defeating Washington State 39–34 in the championship game in Kansas City. 

The Badgers would not return to the National Championship game until 2015, where they lost to the Duke Blue Devils by a score of 68-63.

Schedule

|-
!colspan=6 style=| Regular season

|-
!colspan=6 style=| NCAA tournament

Awards and honors
 Gene Englund, Consensus first team All-American
 John Kotz, NCAA basketball tournament Most Outstanding Player

References

External links
1940–41 Men's Basketball Team: UW-Madison's First and Only NCAA Champions

Wisconsin Badgers men's basketball seasons
NCAA Division I men's basketball tournament championship seasons
NCAA Division I men's basketball tournament Final Four seasons
Wisconsin
Wisconsin Badgers
Wisconsin Badger
Wisconsin Badger